The Morning Star Company is a Woodland, California-based agribusiness and food processing company founded in 1970.  The company was originally founded as a trucking outfit by Chris Rufer, who remains the sole owner.

Morning Star processes 25% of the California processing tomato production, and supplies approximately 40% of the U.S. industrial tomato paste and diced tomato markets. It processes 1 million tonnes of tomatoes each year. It has 400 employees and revenues of $700 million. It is the global market leader in tomato processing.

The company has attracted attention for its philosophy of no supervisory management, described by owner/founder, Chris Rufer, as "Self-Management." Workers are encouraged to innovate independently, define job responsibilities themselves, and even make equipment purchasing decisions in consultation with experts. Similarly, compensation is based on peer evaluations.

In 2013, Morning Star was listed as one of INC Magazine's Audacious Companies.

See also
 Worker cooperative

References

External links
 Official site

Food manufacturers of the United States
Food and drink companies established in 1970
1970 establishments in California
Tomatoes